Club Baloncesto Almansa, also known as Afanion CB Almansa for sponsorship reasons, is a professional basketball club based in Almansa, Castilla-La Mancha, that currently plays in LEB Oro, the second tier of Spanish basketball.

History
In 2017, CB Almansa promotes to Liga EBA and one year later, just in their debut season, the club reaches the LEB Plata by winning the three games of the promotion stage played at home.

The success of the club would continue with a third consecutive promotion, thus reaching the LEB Oro, second tier, on 25 May 2019.

Players

Current roster

Depth chart

Season by season

References

Basketball teams in Castilla–La Mancha
Former Liga EBA teams
LEB Plata teams
Almansa